Shinonome Station (東雲駅 Shinonome-eki) is the name of two train stations in Japan:

Shinonome Station (Kyoto)
 Shinonome Station (Tokyo)

See also Tōun Station (東雲駅 Tōun-eki) in Hokkaido (written with the same kanji but with different pronunciation).

See also
 Shinonome (disambiguation)